The retention of the frigate Libertad in Ghana was an episode that occurred on October 2, 2012, in which the frigate , training ship of the Argentinian Navy, was detained in the Ghanaian port of Tema, due to a claim by the so-called vulture funds. The amparo appeal that triggered the retention of the ship was presented before the Ghanaian courts by the NML Capital Group, based in the Cayman Islands, in order to collect debt papers that did not enter into the exchange of the default of 2001. For its part, the Argentinian Ministry of Foreign Affairs described this legal action as a "cunning attack against Argentina [by] the vulture funds". On the occasion, Foreign Minister Héctor Timerman affirmed that warships could not be seized, in accordance with international legislation in this regard. Meanwhile, President Cristina Fernández de Kirchner maintained that "as long as I am president, they will be able to keep the frigate, but the freedom, dignity, and sovereignty of this country, no one will keep."

Despite the pressure exerted by the vulture funds in the Ghanaian courts and the media controversy surrounding the matter, the Minister of Economy Hernán Lorenzino affirmed that Argentina would continue to pay its debt commitments to 93% of the holders of bonds that entered the 2005 and 2010 swaps and which would maintain its policy of not paying vulture funds that wanted to obtain full payment of the debt in default. “We are going to continue paying 93% of the creditors that entered the swap, in dollars, euros, and yen, as appropriate; we are going to respect 93% of the bondholders, many Argentines, who made the effort that some living want to take advantage of" the minister declared, at the request of the president.

Finally, following the guidelines of the United Nations Convention on the Law of the Sea, it was ruled that "the Republic of Ghana, by detaining the warship" ARA Fragata Libertad", then keeping it detained, not allowing it to refuel and taking various judicial measures in against it, violated its international obligation to respect the immunities of jurisdiction and execution enjoyed by said vessel in accordance with Article 32 -UNCLOS- and Article 3 of the 1926 Convention for the Unification of Certain Rules relating to the immunity of vessels state property, as well as other rules of general or customary international law strongly established in this regard. Ghana had prevented the exercise of the right to leave the jurisdictional waters of the coastal state and the right of freedom of navigation enjoyed by the ARA Libertad Frigate along with its crew. Finally, the International Sea Tribunal affirmed the international responsibility of Ghana requiring it to order this state to immediately cease the aforementioned violations; pay adequate compensation and offer a solemn salute to the Argentine flag as satisfaction for the moral damage caused.

Beginning of the crisis

The ship had sailed from Buenos Aires on June 2, 2012, with more than 300 sailors on board to make its annual trip instruction and docked at ports in Brazil, Suriname, Guyana, Venezuela, Portugal, Spain, Morocco and Senegal before arriving in Ghana.

Given the position of the government of Ghana to keep the frigate Libertad in the port of Tema, the Argentinian government ordered the evacuation of the ship on October 20, 2012, due to a "lack of guarantees for the human rights of its 326 crew members". a total of 281 crew members were evacuated. In the same statement, Foreign Ministry also accused the Justice of Ghana to aspire to a sovereign country negotiate with an entity dedicated to financial piracy from its fiscal lair in the Caribbean, stated that the retention of the Navy's flagship was "a kidnapping, extortion and an act of piracy" against Argentina and that the "Argentinian Government has been forced to make this decision since Ghana's decision, in addition to violating international law, puts the integrity of the crew at risk, since it denies them the necessary supplies to keep a ship in port. Additionally, the San Martín Palace statement reported that "All foreigners who participated in the training trip would also be evacuated in the same operation".

For the maintenance and care of the frigate, a minimum number of 44 soldiers was available. This contingent defended its position with arms when port authorities tried to move the ship from berth number 11, where it was located, to another less traveled place after the port authorities cut off the water and electricity supply to the frigate to force its transfer. With diplomatic intervention, the incident was corrected and the water and power supply to the ship was restored, without the need to move the ship from its place at the berth.

Steps for recovery

After the retention of the Libertad frigate by the Ghanaian authorities, the Argentinian Government began the steps to achieve the release of the ship and its subsequent return to the country. On October 9, 2012, Argentina requested to the Commercial Court of Ghana for the immediate release of the frigate, arguing that warships were not subject to embargoes, invoking diplomatic immunity of the school ship, according to the Vienna Convention. However, 2 days later, the court rejected Argentina's request, arguing there is not "sufficient grounds put forward by the plaintiff to dismiss the judgment of the court".

At that time, the crew was composed of 192 NCOs, 69 Argentinian midshipmen, 15 Chileans, 8 Uruguayans, 26 staff officers and 13 special guests, who belong to other armed forces of Argentina and other nations of South America.

Faced with this rejection, the Argentinian Foreign Ministry issued a statement in which it affirmed its willingness to "exhaust the judicial instances of Ghana and the international courts in defense of its sovereignty, against the vulture funds and those who try to impose a global system where the peoples live under to speculative capital".

Faced with the refusal of the Ghanaian judicial authorities, Argentina addressed a proposal to the United Nations (UN) to analyze the situation, which directly affects the immunity system of the States that governs the community of nations, by not respecting the immunity of a military vessel. With this agenda, Héctor Timerman went to New York, where he met with the UN Secretary General Ban Ki-moon. After deliberating on this Argentinian proposal, the International Maritime Organization (IMO), a body dependent on the UN, resolved on November 28, 2012, that the frigate Libertad was a warship and that, therefore, it had immunity and could not be seized. The definitive proof of this condition as a military vessel was presented by the Argentinian ambassador to the United Kingdom Alicia Castro, who finally demonstrated that the frigate Libertad did not have the registration number defined for vessels engaged in commercial activities because it was a warship.

Finally, on December 15, 2012, more than two months after, the International Tribunal for the Law of the Sea ordered Ghana, by unanimous decision, the immediate release of the frigate Libertad. The court ruled that "Ghana must unconditionally release the frigate, ensuring that the ship, its commander and crew can leave the port of Tema, ensuring its provisioning" and also pondered that the warship is an "expression of Argentinian sovereignty" and that Ghana's decision to hijack and retain the ship affected diplomatic immunity under international law. International Tribunal for the Law of the Sea also set December 22 of the same year as the maximum term for compliance with the judgment and Ghana should comply with the ruling and release the ship "without conditions" and that the parties involved share the costs of the process. Upon hearing the news, the president of Argentina, Cristina Fernández de Kirchner, celebrated, from her Twitter account, announcing: "Once again we comply: the Fragata returns".

Release and return to Argentina

On December 18, 2012, the Foreign Minister of Ghana announced that it would request the revocation of the court order that held the frigate Libertad in the country, in the sense that comply with the ruling of the International Court for the Law of the Sea and realize their release. After refueling and conditioning the ship - and after the embarkation of the 98 crew members who had been sent from Buenos Aires to rebuild the crew - the frigate Libertad left the port of Tema on December 19, 2012, undertaking his return, with arrival scheduled for January 9 , 2013 to the Argentinian city of Mar del Plata. Finally, Ambassador Susana Ruiz Cerutti, architect of the Argentinian legal strategy that allowed the return of the frigate Libertad and the Minister of Justice and Attorney General of Ghana, Marietta Brew Appiah -Oponq, signed the agreement to terminate the arbitration process. The Supreme Court of Ghana had considered that the judge of first instance had erred in not declining his jurisdiction in an attempt to seize an asset of a sovereign State affected for military purposes. Meanwhile, the Supreme Court of Ghana ruled that the retention by the Ghanaian authorities of the frigate Libertad was unfair and assured that the decision to retain the Argentinian ship could have endangered the security of Ghana and that it could have triggered a military and diplomatic conflict. The International Court stressed that the warship is an "expression of Argentinian sovereignty", so the Ghanaian decision to retain the ship affects diplomatic immunity according to international law.

According to what was planned after its departure from the port of Tema, the frigate Libertad arrived in Mar del Plata on January 9, 2013. As part of the celebrations for the return of the frigate, an act was held that was led by President Cristina Fernández de Kirchner. In her speech, the president affirmed that the ship "symbolizes the unrestricted defense of the sovereign rights of Argentina and its national dignity" and added: "Today more than ever, a country yes, a colony no".

On the other hand, no representative of the opposition was present at the ceremony, despite the fact that invitations were extended to them. Regarding the absence of opponents, the chief of staff said that “when the frigate was seized they were crying out to give in to the vulture funds and when it returns to Argentina, without yielding one apex of our sovereignty, they turn their back on the government, but to the Argentinian people". Ricardo Alfonsín of the Radical Civic Union opined that "All Argentines celebrate the return of the frigate Libertad. But as a citizen I am also saddened by the use that the Government makes".

Aftermath

During the efforts to achieve the release of the frigate Libertad, Minister of Foreign Affairs Héctor Timerman announced that Argentina will demand that Ghana be declared "internationally responsible" for the illegal embargo and that Ghana should be forced to "compensate Argentina for the damages caused and to redress the national symbols". Timerman pointed out that the process will run at the International Tribunal for the Law of the Sea, to deal with the substantive issue that is the international responsibility of Ghana for the illegal embargo of the frigate.

Despite the national government's decision not to yield to the pressure of vulture funds, some opposition leaders presented alternative proposals. Deputy Alberto Asseff presented a bill in the Chamber for the National Executive Branch to promote the creation of a "Patriotic Fund" of 20 million dollars, aimed at lifting the embargo on vulture funds. That money would be raised through donations. This proposal, however, did not have major repercussions on the chamber of deputies.

Recalling that attitude, the president, in her speech on the arrival of the frigate, said that "there were vultures and here there were caranchos squawks. But we did not hear any" ... "paradoxically, many of those who said that his knees were those who had borrowed to Argentina".

For his part, former senator of the Radical Civic Union, José María García Arecha, presented a plan to create an open account in a state bank so that citizens of the entire country could "collaborate" and thus gather the necessary amount to pay to Ghana's justice and lift the embargo. This proposal, also supported by parties such as the Republican Proposal (PRO), could not be carried out either, as the lawyers consulted indicated that the initiative could harm the negotiations of the government. The referent of this party, the Head of Government of the city of Buenos Aires Mauricio Macri insisted, even after the return of the frigate to the country, on paying the vulture funds. The Supreme Court of Ghana, ordered the Elliot vulture fund (parent company of the Group NML Capital) to pay about 8 million dollars to the management of the port of Tema, for the expenses of having hijacked the frigate Libertad.

See also
 Argentine debt restructuring
 International Tribunal for the Law of the Sea

References

Presidency of Cristina Fernández de Kirchner
Foreign relations of Argentina
Foreign relations of Ghana